The Jardin de l'alchimiste is a private contemporary garden in the town of Eygalières, in the Bouches-du-Rhône Department of France.  It is classified by the French Ministry of Culture as one of the Remarkable Gardens of France.

The garden was created in 1997 by two landscape architects, Arnaud Maurières and Eric Ossart.  It begins with a labyrinth, and it is a philosophical essay in the form of a garden, representing physical and intellectual development, and the development of the senses. Part of the garden is devoted to plants popularly associated with magic and alchemy.

See also
 Gardens of Provence-Alpes-Côte d'Azur

External links

 Page on the site of the Committee of Parks and Gardens of France

Provence
Alchimiste